Telegeusis texensis, known generally as the "Texas long-lipped beetle", is a species of long-lipped beetles in the family Omethidae. It is found in North America.

References

 Fleenor, Scott B., and Stephen W. Taber (2001). "A new long-lipped beetle from Texas and a review of the genus Telegeusis Horn (Coleoptera: Telegeusidae)". The Coleopterists Bulletin, vol. 55, no. 4, 481–484.

Further reading

 Arnett, R.H. Jr., M. C. Thomas, P. E. Skelley and J. H. Frank. (eds.). (2002). American Beetles, Volume II: Polyphaga: Scarabaeoidea through Curculionoidea. CRC Press LLC, Boca Raton, FL.
 Arnett, Ross H. (2000). American Insects: A Handbook of the Insects of America North of Mexico. CRC Press.
 Richard E. White. (1983). Peterson Field Guides: Beetles. Houghton Mifflin Company.

Elateroidea